Jonathan Ingersoll (April 16, 1747 – January 12, 1823) was a Connecticut politician of the late eighteenth and early nineteenth centuries.

Early life
Ingersoll was born on April 16, 1747 in Ridgefield in what was then called the Province of Connecticut, a part of British America. He was the son of Rev. Jonathan Ingersoll (1713–1778) and Dorcas (née Moss) Ingersoll (1725–1811).  His father was the chaplain for the Connecticut Troops during the French and Indian War.  His sister, Esther Ingersoll, was married to Lt. Ebenezer Olmsted.

His uncle was Jared Ingersoll Sr., a British colonial official, and his cousin, Jared Ingersoll, served as Attorney General of Pennsylvania.  His cousin's son (his first cousin once removed), Charles Jared Ingersoll, was a U.S. Representative and the father of author Edward Ingersoll.

He graduated from Yale College in 1766 and began practicing as a lawyer.

Career
From 1792 until 1797, he was a member of Connecticut council of assistants.

On September 16, 1793, he was elected as a member representing his state at-large in the United States House of Representatives, by a special election (to replace Congressman-elect Benjamin Huntington who had become a Judge). However he declined this office before the 3rd Congress convened, so he was never sworn in.  A replacement was elected at a special election on November 11, 1793.  He served as Superior court judge in Connecticut, 1798–1801 and 1811–1816.

Ingersoll was the ninth Lieutenant Governor of Connecticut from 1816 until his death in 1823.

Personal life
On April 1, 1786, he was married to Grace Isaacs (1772–1850), the daughter of Ralph Isaacs, Jr., a Yale educated merchant who was prominent in New Haven and Branford.  Together, they were the parents of:

 Grace Ingersoll (1787–1816), who married Peter Grellet and died aged 29 in Paris, France.
 Ralph Isaacs Ingersoll (1789–1872), a U.S. Representative from Connecticut who served as the U.S. Minister to the Russian Empire under President James K. Polk.
 Mary Ingersoll (1791–1842)
 William Isaacs Ingersoll (1793–1830)
 Charles Jared Ingersoll (1795–1795), who died in infancy.
 Charles Anthony Ingersoll (1798–1860), a United States federal judge nominated by President Franklin Pierce.
 Harriet Ingersoll (1798–1872)
 Jonathan Ingersoll (1803–1875)
 Edward Ingersoll (1809–1809), who died in infancy.
 Edward Ingersoll (1810–1883), an Episcopal minister in Buffalo, New York.

Ingersoll died while in office on January 12, 1823, in New Haven, Connecticut. He was buried in Grove Street Cemetery in New Haven.

Descendants
Through his son Ralph, he was the grandfather of seven, including John Van den Heuvel Ingersoll (1815–1846), a Yale educated lawyer who edited a political paper in Ohio and served as secretary of the Indian Commission, Colin Macrae Ingersoll (1819–1903), who was a member of Congress from Connecticut and married Julia Harriet Pratt, the daughter of U.S. Representative Zadock Pratt, and Charles Roberts Ingersoll (1821–1903), who served as Governor of Connecticut from 1873 to 1877 and married Virginia Gregory, the daughter of Admiral Francis Gregory.

Through his son Charles, he was the grandfather of Charles Dennis Ingersoll (1843–1905), a lawyer in New York City, and Thomas Chester Ingersoll (1845–1884).

References

External links

|-

1747 births
1823 deaths
American people of English descent
Ingersoll family
Lieutenant Governors of Connecticut
Members of the Connecticut General Assembly Council of Assistants (1662–1818)
People from Ridgefield, Connecticut
Toleration Party politicians
Yale College alumni